Raymond Ching (born 1939), also known as Raymond Harris-Ching and Ray Ching, is a New Zealand painter. Ching is known for his contemporary bird and wildlife paintings.  His ornithological illustrations have appeared in books such as The Reader's Digest Book of British Birds.

Background 
Ching was born in Wellington, New Zealand. Around the age of twelve he dropped out of high school and started an apprenticeship in advertising, eventually becoming an art director. Dissatisfied with this career path, he turned to painting. A seminal experience from his youth has been noted as influencing his interest in ornithological illustration: during a class visit to a museum, Ching became fascinated by a collection of stuffed hummingbirds, inspiring a lifelong love and fascination with birds, feathers, and flight.

Painting career 
In the 1960s, Ching began to exhibit and sell paintings of birds.  His first exhibition, Thirty Birds, at the John Leech Galleries in Auckland in 1966 was of highly detailed watercolours using drybrush technique, and was an immediate sell-out. He was discovered internationally by Sir William Collins of Collins publishing. A keen ornithologist, Sir William was scouring the world for bird painters to produce a prestigious series of book.  Sir William came to New Zealand, attended Ching's second exhibition at the John Leech Galleries and discussed publishing a book of his work.  On returning to the UK, Sir William took some of Ching's work to his friend, Sir Peter Scott, who then telegraphed Ching inviting him to call on him at Slimbridge.

Within a short time, Ching moved to London, where he lived near Portobello Road. Before Collins had a chance to produce the book discussed with Sir William, Ray was introduced to The Reader's Digest who, with Collins, had been planning a major book on the birds of Britain.  Almost every bird artist in the British isles had been assessed and rejected as not having what was required to produce a breakthrough in field guides.  The book, in addition to containing all the accurate information on the birds of Britain, should have the style and drama to appeal to those who had never picked up a field guide in their lives.  The publishers had begun to despair of ever finding anyone with the graphic excitement they believed necessary, and the project had been almost abandoned when Ray appeared on the scene.

Deeply impressed with the originality and uniqueness of his work, the publishers quickly realised that here was the artist for The Reader's Digest Book of British Birds.  They asked him how long he would need to paint the 230 full-colour portraits required.  The publishers believed the project entailed as much as six years' work, and had earlier thought to spread the commission among six artists, each to take a year. Although he had arrived in England with the intention of getting on with his own book, the offer struck a nerve in the young colonial wanting to make his mark. "I can do them all myself and in under a year!" he rashly declared. It was a huge effort and left him at the end of that year, ill, exhausted and penniless.

Published in 1969, The Reader's Digest Book of British Birds has become the world's most successful and biggest selling bird book, translated into over ten European languages and many, many editions in hardback and paperback. It remains in print and has had an enormous influence over both bird lovers and artists

Before the book was published Ray had moved to Rye, East Sussex. Here he continued to paint, primarily birds and other animals. He works in oils and watercolours, usually on a gessoed masonite panel or canvas which assists with the high detail. The style of his art might be described as conservative realism, most images having an almost photographic quality, although he is often comfortable leaving out detail in the backgrounds. Ching work is primarily of birds, but has included other wildlife landscapes and portraits.

Raymond Ching paintings usually fetch six figures. He continues to experiment with subject matter such as birds and the human figure in a series of imaginative works. He cannot be classified as a wildlife artist, which, although he admires many exponents of this genre, has never been his raison d'etre. His love of the look of birds and his desire to depict them, especially in flight, is his continuing passion. He is very interested and knowledgeable about conservation but that is not the primary driving force of his art.

He design a British postage stamp in 1999 titled Darwin's theory as part of a series on famous British scientists.

Ching is married to author Carol Sinclair who wrote the biography, Masters of the wild: Ray Harris-Ching.

Bibliography
 Book of British Birds, pub. The Reader’s Digest, London, 1969 Many editions (still in print)
 Raymond Ching, The Bird Paintings, watercolours and Pencil Drawings 1969-1975 pub. Collins, London,1978. Standard and limited editions
 The Art of Raymond Ching, pub. Collins, Auckland,1981
 Studies & Sketches of a Bird Painter, pub. Lansdowne, Melbourne,1981
 New Zealand Birds, An Artist’s Field-Studies, pub. Reed Methuen, Auckland, 1986
 Wild Portraits, The Wildlife Art of Ray Harris-Ching, co-pub. SeTo Publishing, Auckland, 1988 co-pub. Airlife Publishing, UK, 1988. Standard and limited editions
 Kiwis:  A Monograph of the Family Aptergidae, pub. SeTo Publishing, Auckland, 1990. Standard and limited editions. 
 Ray Harris-Ching - Journey of an Artist, by Carol Sinclair Smith pub. Briar Patch Press, South Carolina, 1990. 
 Voice from the Wilderness, Ray Harris Ching-Errol Fuller-David Lank, Swan Hill Press, Shrewsbury, England, 1994. 
Aesop’s Kiwi Fables, Bateman, by Ray Ching, Introduction by Richard Wolfe, pub. David Bateman Ltd, Auckland, 2012 
Drawn From Paradise: The Discovery, Art and Natural History of the Birds of Paradise, by Sir David Attenborough and Errol Fuller, Illustrations by Ray Ching, pub, Harper Collins, London, 2012 
Dawn Chorus: The Legendary Voyage to New Zealand of Aesop, the Fabled Teller of Fables, by Ray Ching, pub. David Batemen Ltd, 2014, 2019,  
Aesop’s Outback Fables, by Ray Ching, pub. ARTIS Gallery, 2018,

References

External links
Ching Biography from the National Museum of Wildlife Art
Ching's New Zealand based Gallery

1939 births
Living people
New Zealand painters
People from Wellington City
New Zealand bird artists